The 2023 Cup of Nations will be the second edition of the Cup of Nations, an international women's football tournament, consisting of a series of friendly games, that will be held in Australia from 16 to 22 February 2023. The four national teams involved in the tournament registered a squad of 23 players.

The age listed for each player is on 16 February 2023, the first day of the tournament. The numbers of caps and goals listed for each player do not include any matches played after the start of tournament. A flag is included for coaches that are of a different nationality than their own national team.

Squads

Australia
Coach:  Tony Gustavsson

The squad was announced on 2 February 2023.

Czech Republic
Coach: Karel Rada

The squad was announced on 30 January 2023.

Jamaica
Coach: Lorne Donaldson

The squad was announced on 21 January 2023. On 4 February 2023, Khadija Shaw withdrew due to personal reasons and was replaced by Shania Hayles. The following week, Hayles and Siobhan Wilson withdrew due to injury and were replaced by Kayla McCoy and Tiffany Cameron.

Spain
Coach: Jorge Vilda

The squad was announced on 6 February 2023. The following day, Bibiane Schulze withdrew due to a continuing groin injury and was replaced by Berta Pujadas.

Player representation

By club
Clubs with 3 or more players represented are listed.

By club nationality

By club federation

By representatives of domestic league

References

2023 Cup of Nations
2022–23 in Australian women's soccer
2023 in women's association football
February 2023 sports events in Australia
Soccer in New South Wales
Cup of Nations (Australia)